Targus is a privately owned multinational mobile computing accessories company that designs, manufactures, and sells laptop and tablet cases, computer accessories such as mice, keyboards, and privacy screens, as well as universal docking stations. Targus released the world’s first laptop case in 1983.

Targus employs approximately 500 people globally. Mikel H. Williams is CEO and Chairman.

Overview 
Targus was founded by 1983 Neil Bruce-Copp in Barnes, London, after he invented the world’s first personal computer carrying case and secured orders from IBM and ICL to fund Targus Group. In 1986, Targus launched its first laptop case, the T3100L, with a 250-unit order from Toshiba. 

In 1995, Targus became known as Targus Group International and had offices in the US, Canada, Hong Kong, Taipei, Australia, and several more throughout Europe.

Targus opened its new headquarters in Anaheim, California in 2000. In 2004, Targus launched its first docking station, joined the Bluetooth marketplace, and developed the SafePort Air Protection System.

Early in 2005, Targus joined the mobile device market with a range of iPod accessories. Since 2015 Targus has been a Samsung and Google partner.

References

External links

 Targus UK

Computer companies of the United States
Privately held companies based in California
Computer companies established in 1983
1983 establishments in California
Companies based in Anaheim, California
The Carlyle Group
2005 mergers and acquisitions
2016 mergers and acquisitions